Pedro César Cayuqueo Millaqueo (b. Puerto Saavedra, December 28, 1975) is a Mapuche-Chilean journalist and activist involved in the Mapuche struggle.

Biography 
Pedro Cayuqueo is a Mapuche journalist and writer, the author of eight books on opinion journalism, investigative journalism and historical revisionism, all of which revolve around the Mapuche cause and were published by Catalonia. His best-selling book is "Historia Secreta Mapuche" (2017), and his most recent work in the matter is "The Wallmapu" (2021). He was the founder and first executive editor of the newspapers Mapuche Times and Azkintuwe, in Temuco, both of which circulated for over a decade and were also published in Argentina. He was the presenter of the TV program "Kulmapu" – a show centered in the Mapuche culture – which aired on CNN Chile and VTR in 2015 and 2016. He has been a regular columnist at The Clinic and Caras magazine, and has also written for the newspapers El Austral de Temuco and La Tercera.

In the mid 90s, he entered Law School at Temuco Catholic University with the intention of becoming the first Mapuche lawyer to take their cause to the Courts of Justice. Then, in 1998, he joined the Coordinadora Arauco-Malleco (CAM), and one year later – acting as its spokesman – he delivered an address before the Office of the United Nations High Commissioner for Human Rights in Geneva, Switzerland. As soon as he returned to his country, in May 1999, Special Prosecutor Archivaldo Loyola ordered his imprisonment accusing him of usurpation of land, theft of wood and misprision of felony, along with other leaders of the CAM. The legal actions taken against Cayuqueo by the Chilean government forced him to drop out of Law School, and – although briefely – he was incarcerated more than once, doing time in the prisons of Lebu, Traiguén and Nueva Imperial.  After a fracture within the Coordinadora Arauco-Malleco, he left the organisation in 2001.

He then went on to become a journalist, in order to defend the Mapuche cause from a less confrontational position.

From 2012 to 2016 he was a member of the Advisory Board at he Instituto Nacional de Derechos Humanos, and has also been in the board of directors at the Think tank "Espacio Público" and the "Corporación de Profesionales Mapuche".

His latest literary work is a children's book entitled "Iñchiñ" (We), published in 2022.

Cayuqueo is the father of one daughter and currently lives in Viña del Mar.

Works 

 Solo por ser indios, Catalonia, Santiago, 2012
 La voz de los lonkos, Catalonia, Santiago, 2013
 Esa ruca llamada Chile, Catalonia, Santiago, 2014
 Huenchumilla. La historia del hombre de oro, Catalonia, Santiago, 2015
 Fuerte Temuco, Catalonia, Santiago, 2016
 Historia secreta mapuche, Catalonia, Santiago, 2017
 Porfiada y rebelde es la memoria, Catalonia, Santiago, 2018
 Historia secreta mapuche 2, Catalonia, Santiago, 2020
 The Wallmapu, Catalonia, Santiago, 2021
 Iñchiñ, Catalonia, Santiago, 2022

Awards 

 Premio del Colegio de Periodistas de Chile, 2011
 Premio al Periodismo Iberoamericano Samuel Chavkin, 2013 (North American Congress on Latin America and New York University
 Santiago Municipal Literature Award, best non-fiction work for Historia secreta mapuche, 2018

References 

 Periódico Azkintuwe
 Artículos de Cayuqueo at The Clinic
 Columnas de Cayuqueo at La Tercera

1975 births
Chilean journalists
People from Puerto Saavedra
Living people
Indigenous writers of the Americas
Mapuche writers
20th-century male writers
21st-century male writers
20th-century Mapuche people
21st-century Mapuche people
Mapuche historians
Mapuche journalists
Historians of the Mapuche world
Chilean people of Mapuche descent
University of La Frontera alumni